Abietinella may refer to:
 Abietinella (hydrozoan), a genus of hydrozoans in the family Zygophylacidae
 Abietinella (plant), a genus of plants in the family Thuidiaceae